Father Alexander Pavlovich Vasiliev (1894 in Yekaterinoslav, Russian Empire – 1944? in USSR) was an Orthodox (later the Greek-Catholic) priest.

Biography

He was born in 1894 in Yekaterinoslav (now Dnipro, Ukraine) in a family of an Orthodox priest. He graduated from high school in Mariupol and after, attended Moscow Theological Academy. On 1 October 1927 he was ordained priest by Orthodox Bishop Bartholomew Remov. Vasiliev served as rector of the Church of Saint Nikita the Martyr in Krylatskoye under Moscow. On 25 December 1928 was secretly attached to the Catholic Church by Bishop Pius Neve. On February 15, 1931, he was arrested in Moscow in the case of Sergei Solovyov and was accused of espionage and counterrevolutionary literature. As a condition for the withdrawal of charges, suggesting a return to Orthodoxy, from which Father Alexander refused. On 18 August 1931 he was sentenced to 10 years in labor camps. Father Vasiliev in 1934 was transferred to a camp in the Chita region, which already has a group of "Stakhanovite" to be able to financially support his wife and daughters. The exact date and place of death is unknown, died no later than 1944.

References

External links
 http://www.catholic.ru/modules.php?name=Encyclopedia&op=content&tid=5724

1894 births
1944 deaths
People from Dnipro
Converts to Eastern Catholicism from Eastern Orthodoxy
Russian Eastern Catholics
Former Russian Orthodox Christians